Maya Fyodorovna Sozonova (born May 28, 1965 in Almaty) is a retired female race walker from Kazakhstan.  She competed for Kazakhstan in the 1996 and 2000 Summer Olympics.

Achievements

References

External links
 
sports-reference

1965 births
Living people
Sportspeople from Almaty
Kazakhstani female racewalkers
Athletes (track and field) at the 1996 Summer Olympics
Athletes (track and field) at the 2000 Summer Olympics
Olympic athletes of Kazakhstan
Kazakhstani people of Russian descent